Norman Fell (born Norman Noah Feld; March 24, 1924 – December 14, 1998) was an American actor of film and television, most famous for his role as landlord Mr. Roper on the sitcom Three's Company and its spin-off, The Ropers, and his film roles in Ocean's 11 (1960), The Graduate (1967), and Bullitt (1968). Early in his career, he was billed as Norman Feld.

Early life
Fell was born on March 24, 1924, in Philadelphia, Pennsylvania, to Samuel and Edna Feld. His father was an Austrian Jewish immigrant, and his maternal grandparents were Russian Jews. He attended Central High School of Philadelphia. He studied drama at Temple University after serving as a tail gunner on a B-25 Mitchell in the United States Army Air Forces during World War II. He later honed his craft at The Actors Studio and the Black Hills Players.

Career
Aside from Fell's best-known television work, he also played minor character roles in several films, including the original Ocean's 11 with the Rat Pack (Frank Sinatra, Dean Martin, Sammy Davis Jr., Peter Lawford and Joey Bishop), It's a Mad, Mad, Mad, Mad World, PT 109 with Cliff Robertson as John F. Kennedy, Mike Nichols' The Graduate, Bullitt with Steve McQueen and Catch-22 (as Sergeant Towser).  He appeared alongside Ronald Reagan in Reagan's last film, The Killers with Lee Marvin and Clu Gulager, in which Reagan portrays a villain who slaps Angie Dickenson. In 1992, he starred as a hotel owner in a comedy film titled Hexed.

On TV, Fell portrayed Mike in Joe and Mabel (1955–1956), Howie Fletcher in The Tom Ewell Show (1960–1961), Meyer Meyer in 87th Precinct (1961–1962), Charles Wilentz in Dan August (1970–1971), Nathan Davidson in Needles and Pins (1973), Bernie Solkin in Executive Suite (1976–1977), Richie's father in Richie Brockelman, Private Eye (1978), and Ben Cooper in Teachers Only (1982–1983).

From 1977 to 1979, Fell portrayed the main characters' landlord Stanley Roper on the hit sitcom Three's Company (a role with some similarities to Mr. McCleery in The Graduate).  He continued the role as the co-lead with Audra Lindley playing his wife, Helen, on The Ropers, a spin-off which lasted two seasons, airing from 1979 to 1980.

Fell won a Golden Globe Award for Best TV Actor in a Supporting Role in 1979 for Three's Company. He was nominated for an Emmy Award for his dramatic performance as the boxing trainer of Tom Jordache (Nick Nolte) in the miniseries Rich Man, Poor Man. His final television appearance was a cameo as Mr. Roper on an episode of the sitcom Ellen in 1997.

Personal life
On May 21, 1950, Fell married Dolores Pikoos in Philadelphia.  They divorced in 1954 and Fell married and divorced two subsequent times. He had two daughters, Tracy and Mara, with his second wife and adopted a son with his third wife, Karen Weingard.

Death
On November 26 (Thanksgiving Day) of 1998, Fell had become too weak to get out of bed at his Marina del Rey home. He was rushed to the hospital where he was diagnosed with bone marrow cancer. He died at the Motion Picture and Television's retirement home in Woodland Hills, California on December 14, 1998, at the age of 74.

Filmography

Television

References

External links

 
  (as Norman Feld)
 
 

1924 births
1998 deaths
20th-century American male actors
American male film actors
American male television actors
American people of Austrian-Jewish descent
American people of Russian-Jewish descent
United States Army Air Forces personnel of World War II
Best Supporting Actor Golden Globe (television) winners
Central High School (Philadelphia) alumni
Jewish American male actors
Male actors from Philadelphia
Deaths from cancer in California
Deaths from multiple myeloma
United States Army Air Forces soldiers
Temple University alumni
20th-century American Jews